Optimism Monthly was a Czech not-for-profit literary magazine, which from 1995 to 2009 published poetry, prose, and art by Prague-based and international writers. When operational, Optimism published a new edition each month for ten months of the year. Each issue was published in English and contained writers from across Europe, as far east as Bulgaria, as well as American and Australian authors. It sold for 49 Czech crowns in English-Language book stores across Prague, Europe, the United States and Australia. As of 2009, it had published works by over one hundred and thirty writers. It was started by an American, Tim Otis, who was joined after the second issue by another American, Thomas Alan Ward, as editor, after issue 30, Ward was replaced by Laura Conway.  There were a total of 49 issues.

Though now defunct, the magazine persists in a virtual form via its website, where a pdf file of the latest edition is available to download. The website maintains its original product description, and has released a notice (dated from both 2003 and 2009 on different pages of the website) concerning its future publication:

External links
http://fireedit.com/optimism/ Official Website

1995 establishments in the Czech Republic
2009 disestablishments in the Czech Republic
Defunct literary magazines published in Europe
Defunct magazines published in the Czech Republic
Literary magazines published in the Czech Republic
Magazines established in 1995
Magazines disestablished in 2009
Magazines published in Prague
Monthly magazines
Visual arts magazines